Hainichen may refer to:

 Hainichen, Saxony
 Hainichen, Thuringia